Cogent Communications is a multinational internet service provider based in the United States. Cogent's primary services consist of Internet access and data transport, offered on a fiber optic, IP data-only network, along with colocation in data centers. Although Cogent is not a Tier 1 ISP by definition, due to lack of complete IPv6 connectivity, the company still advertises itself a Tier 1 ISP. There has been debate among networking professionals as to whether or not this amounts to false advertising.

Acquisition history
Cogent was founded in 1999 at the peak of the industry's growth and was funded by angel investors including members of Keiretsu Forum. In three years, Cogent acquired 13 other failing carriers, purchasing $14 billion in capital for $60 million, including $4 billion worth of Property, Plant and Equipment.
 September 2001 – Acquires the assets of NetRail
 February 2002 – Acquires Allied Riser
 April 2002 – Acquires Building Access Agreements from OnSite Access
 April 2002 – Acquires Major US Assets of PSINet
 September 2002 – Acquires Major Assets of FiberCity Networks
 February 2003 – Acquires Fiber Network Solutions
 May 2003 – Acquires Assets of Applied Theory
 January 2004 – Acquires LambdaNet France & Spain
 March 2004 – Acquires Fiber Network and Equipment in Germany Out of Former Carrier1 Assets
 September 2004 – Acquires Global Access
 October 2004 – Acquires Aleron Broadband
 December 2004 – Acquires NTT/Verio Dedicated Access Business in U.S.

Peering disputes
Cogent has been controversial in the ISP market for low bandwidth pricing and its public disputes over peering with AOL (2003), Level 3 Communications (2005), France Telecom (2006), Limelight Networks (2007), Telia Carrier (March 2008), and Sprint Nextel (October 2008).

On March 14, 2008, after Cogent stopped routing packets from European network provider Telia (AS 1299), their two networks lost mutual connectivity. The connection was reestablished March 28, 2008 with interconnection points in both the United States and Europe.

On June 6, 2011, Cogent automatically stopped peering with The Department of Energy Sciences Network (ESnet) causing a disruption for three days.

In November 2015, CenturyLink signed a new long-term bilateral interconnection agreement with Cogent Communications.

Cogent has yet to agree on peering with the biggest IPv6 connectivity provider, Hurricane Electric. As of November 2022, direct connectivity between the two networks is impossible. Cogent and Google have also stopped IPv6 peering in 2016. This is rumored to be closely tied to Cogent leveraging Google's IPv4 traffic via a paid customer or to maintain Settlement-Free Interconnect with another network.

In February 2017, Cogent blocked many piracy and streaming sites including The Pirate Bay. This was unintentional due to a poorly crafted Spanish court order.

References

External links
  Official site
 Cogent Communications SEC Filings

Internet service providers of the United States
Companies based in Washington, D.C.
Transit-free networks
Companies listed on the Nasdaq